is a Japanese model from Niigata Prefecture, Japan. As well as modelling the Paris collection, she appears in domestic adverts and national magazines. She is currently signed to Tateoka Office Co., Ltd.

Appearances

Shows
Paris
Christian Dior
John Galliano
Issey Miyake

Tokyo
Chanel
Gucci
Fendi
Armani
Celine
Givenchy
Max Mara
Gianni Versace
Sonia Rykiel
Jean Paul Gaultier
Vivienne Westwood

Commercials
Shiseidō Face
Bigi Halfmoon
Daihatsu Move
Kao Corporation Ravenous
Evian
Kriza
Shiseidō (2000)
Coca-Cola Diet Coke
POLA Inc.
Asahi Breweries Super Dry - "The Super Dry Films"
Mitsui Fudosan Mitsui Outlet Park (April 2008)
Kellogg's (Japan) Special K "Minus Selection" (April 2009)

Magazines
Overseas
Vogue (Taiwan)
madame figaro (France)
Wall Paper (England)
Glue Magazine (America)
Maxim (America)

Domestic (Japan)
Elle
Ryūkōtsūshin
Dune
Crea
Luci
Grazia
weet
an-an
Frau
Miss
with
More
non-no
oggi
Style

Television
A-Studio (TBS) - assistant

CD
Gloria (1999 single) - collaboration with Haruo Chikada and Makihiko Araki)

External links
Tateoka Office page
Official blog (Japanese)
Style.com Lookbook

1979 births
Living people